Jöran Nordberg (1677–1744) was a Swedish historian.

1677 births
1744 deaths
18th-century Swedish historians